The Quranic account of the disciples ( al-ḥawāriyyūn) of Jesus  does not include their names, numbers, or any detailed accounts of their lives. Muslim exegesis, however, more-or-less agrees with the New Testament list and says that the disciples included Peter, Philip, Thomas, Bartholomew, Matthew, Andrew, James, Jude, John and Simon the Zealot. Scholars generally draw a parallel with the disciples of Jesus and the companions of Muhammad, who followed Muhammad during his lifetime, 600 years later.

Textual references

In the Qur'an

The following is a list of all the Qur'anic references to the disciples of Jesus:

In Hadith

The following are Hadith (narrations originating from the words of Muhammad), collected by Muslim ibn al-Hajjaj Nishapuri, which indirectly emphasize Islamic beliefs concerning the disciples of Jesus:

See also
 Sahaba
 Habib the Carpenter
 People of Ya-Sin

References

Followers of Jesus
Articles about multiple people in the Quran